Last Shoot Out is a 2021 American western film directed by Michael Feifer, and starring Michael Welch, Cam Gigandet and Bruce Dern.

Cast
Michael Welch as Jody
Cam Gigandet as Sid
Bruce Dern as Blair Callahan 
Skylar Witte as Jocelyn
Jay Pickett as Twigs
David DeLuise as Joe.
Brock Harris as Billy Tyson
Peter Sherayko as Red
Larry Poole as Wiley

Release
The film was released in select theaters and digital rental on December 3, 2021 and on DVD, Blu-Ray and Digital purchase on December 7, 2021.

Reception
Joe Leydon of Variety gave the film a positive review, calling it “a small-budget indie that aims to please the currently underserved niche audience for oaters.”

References

External links
 
 

2020s English-language films
Films directed by Michael Feifer